Redeemer Church is a large nondenominational Christian church with four campuses; Utica, Rome, and Albany, New York. The main campus is located on Herkimer Rd in Utica. The International Campus in South Utica holds services for Nepali and Burmese refugees. In 2010 the church changed its name from Mount Zion Ministries to Redeemer. Pastor Michael Servello said, “We felt that Mount Zion was more of a name that people don’t understand biblically speaking, but the name Redeemer has incredible application.”  The church has been open since 1980 and was started by Pastor Michael Servello Sr.

Redeemer has a college and high school ministry called Encounter. Services are held on Wednesday nights at the Utica campus. Every November, Redeemer holds the Encounter Conference at the Utica campus which draws in over 1000 young people from all over the nation. Northeast. Pastor Mike Servello said, “It really encourages and builds… kids look forward to this every year.”  The conference lasts for three days and has Christian worship bands and speakers from all over the world

	Redeemer holds children's church during the normal Saturday and Sunday services in the children's wing of the main church called Uptown. Uptown has classes and services for children from one year to seventh grade. A new addition to Uptown is Up Club, an environment for children with special needs which is held at the same time as the rest of the children's services.

	Every May, Redeemer hosts the Redeemer Cup- an international soccer tournament in Proctor Park in Utica, NY. There are 16 teams composed of native citizens from Asia, Africa, Europe, and Latin America. The tournament includes games, food, music, and dancing. Pastor Rick Andrew said; “Soccer grips the world, and we have the world right here in Utica."

References

Churches in New York (state)
Non-denominational Evangelical churches